The Victor Martyn Lynch-Staunton Award is a monetary award given since 1971 by the Canada Council for the Arts to Canadian artists judged to be outstanding in their mid-careers.

Since 2005, the award is given to one recipient in each of the following seven fields: dance, inter-arts, media arts, music, theatre, visual arts and writing and publishing.  The award, worth Cdn$15,000 (CAD), was founded by  Victor Martyn Lynch-Staunton in 1967.

Until 2005, the award was given usually to 3-4 people in the fields of visual arts (including sculpture) and music, though not in both fields every year.  Once, in 1986, it included a "dance teacher and historian", as well as a "critic and curator"; once, in 1971, it included a "weaver",  and once, in 1981, it included a "harpsichord builder".  In 2004, it was not awarded at all.

References

External links
  (includes cumulative list of winners)

Canadian art awards
Canadian theatre awards